Los Toros Futbol Clube are a Salvadoran professional football club based in Usulután, El Salvador.

Recent history
 Segunda División: 2015–

List of coaches
  Miguel Aguilar Obando (July 2015 – September 2015)
  Andrés Tabares (Sept 2015– Dec 2015)
  Carlos Mario Joya (Jan 2016–)

External links

Football clubs in El Salvador
Association football clubs established in 2015
2015 establishments in El Salvador